Tapper may refer to:

Games 
 Tapper (video game), a 1983 arcade game released by Bally Midway
 Tapper World Tour, a reincarnation of the arcade game for iOS
 Tapper (card game), a card game of the Austrian tarot family

Botany 
 Spile, for tapping trees
 Toddy tapper, one who cultivates palm wine

People 
 Tapper (surname)
 Bertha Tapper (1859-1915), Norwegian composer
 Tapper Zukie (born 1955), Jamaican record producer
 Richard Tapper Cadbury (1768–1860), English abolitionist

See also
 Cholmondeley-Tapper
 
 
 Taper (disambiguation)
 Tap (disambiguation)
 Trapper (disambiguation)